Masterpiece is an Iban hard rock band from Sibu, Sarawak, Malaysia.  Originally formed in 2003, the band features Depha Masterpiece (vocals), Kennedy Edwin (guitar-vocals), Willy Edwin (lead guitar), Watt Marcus (bass), Harold Vincent (drums), Valentine Jimmy (keyboards) and Roslee Qadir (keyboards). The band have recorded songs for four studio albums and a number of songs for various collaborative albums. Masterpiece released their debut studio album Merindang Ke Bintang in 2009 and was re-issued through Panggau Buluh Pengerindu Records the following year. Five of songs from Merindang Ke Bintang were written by Depha, while "Kumang Mimpi" is co-written by Roslee Qadir, Kennedy Edwin and Willy Edwin.

In 2013, the band released their second full-length studio album Rock & Roll, which once again credited Depha for songwriting. The album was accompanied by music videos directed by Cosmas Moses Alexander. The following year, Masterpiece released Ngap Sayot through an independent music label, Do Records Entertainment, which also crediting Roslee Qadir for his lyrics on the Sarawak Malay version of "Ngap Sayot". Masterpiece returned in 2016 with their fourth album Ngarap Ka Nuan Nikal Pulai, songwriting for which was credited entirely to Depha. On 5 August 2017, the band released “Perecha” as the second single from their upcoming album. The band released their fifth studio album, Ensera Paragon in August 2018 through their first major label, Warner Music Malaysia.

The following is a list of released songs recorded by Masterpiece:

Songs

References

Masterpiece